In programming languages, type erasure is the load-time process by which explicit type annotations are removed from a program, before it is executed at run-time.  Operational semantics not requiring programs to be accompanied by types are named type-erasure semantics, in contrast with type-passing semantics. Type-erasure semantics is an abstraction principle, ensuring that the run-time execution of a program doesn't depend on type information. In the context of generic programming, the opposite of type erasure is named reification.

Type inference 

The reverse operation is named type inference. Though type erasure can be an easy way to define typing over implicitly typed languages (an implicitly typed term is well-typed if and only if it is the erasure of a well-typed explicitly typed lambda term), it doesn't require an algorithm to check implicitly typed terms.

See also
 Template (C++)
 Problems with type erasure (in Generics in Java)
 Type polymorphism

References

 

Type theory